The simple station without exchange Tygua - San José, forms part of the TransMilenio mass transit system of Bogota inaugurated in the year 2000.

Location 
The station is located in the center-east sector of the city, more specifically on the Avenue of the Comuneros between Carreras 18 and 19.

Serves the demand of the neighborhoods La Estanzuela, El Progreso and its surroundings. The area is predominantly residential.

Origin of the name 
The word Tygua means eagle in the language Muisccubun. This word was taken in honor of the coat of arms of Bogotá, in whose coat of arms the image of this bird is adopted, the second name San José receives it by the proximity with the Hospital San José.

History 
In 2012, when the phase III of the system was put into operation, the construction of the Sixth Street or Avenida los Comuneros trunk was started to establish a connection between the trunks of Carrera Tenth, Caracas Avenue and NQS. It was inaugurated in November 2015 and together with the one of Guatoque - Veraguas conform this trunk that is an extension of the NQS Central.

Main Services

References

External links 
 TransMilenio
 www.surumbo.com official interactive query system TransMilenio maps

TransMilenio
2015 establishments in Colombia